In mathematics, Viète's formula is the following infinite product of nested radicals representing twice the reciprocal of the mathematical constant :

It can also be represented as:

The formula is named after François Viète, who published it in 1593. As the first formula of European mathematics to represent an infinite process, it can be given a rigorous meaning as a limit expression, and marks the beginning of mathematical analysis. It has also been used in calculations of the behavior of systems of springs and masses, and as a motivating example for the concept of statistical independence.

The formula can be derived as a telescoping product of either the areas or perimeters of nested polygons converging to a circle. Alternatively, repeated use of the half-angle formula from trigonometry leads to a generalized formula, discovered by Leonhard Euler, that has Viète's formula as a special case. Many similar formulas involving nested roots or infinite products are now known.

Significance
François Viète (1540–1603) was a French lawyer, privy councillor to two French kings, and amateur mathematician. He published this formula in 1593 in his work Variorum de rebus mathematicis responsorum, liber VIII. At this time, methods for approximating  to (in principle) arbitrary accuracy had long been known. Viète's own method can be interpreted as a variation of an idea of Archimedes of approximating the circumference of a circle by the perimeter of a many-sided polygon, used by Archimedes to find the approximation

As the first representation in European mathematics of a number as the result of an infinite process rather than of a finite calculation, Eli Maor highlights Viète's formula as marking the beginning of mathematical analysis and Jonathan Borwein calls its appearance "the dawn of modern mathematics".

Using his formula, Viète calculated  to an accuracy of nine decimal digits. However, this was not the most accurate approximation to  known at the time, as the Persian mathematician Jamshīd al-Kāshī had calculated  to an accuracy of nine sexagesimal digits and 16 decimal digits in 1424.

Additionally, a derivation of this formula as a product of integrals involving the Rademacher system, equal to the integral of products of the same functions, provides a motivating example for the concept of statistical independence.

Interpretation and convergence
Viète's formula may be rewritten and understood as a limit expression

where

Viète did his work long before the concepts of limits and rigorous proofs of convergence were developed in mathematics; the first proof that this limit exists was not given until the work of Ferdinand Rudio in 1891.

The rate of convergence of a limit governs the number of terms of the expression needed to achieve a given number of digits of accuracy. In Viète's formula, the numbers of terms and digits are proportional to each other: the product of the first  terms in the limit gives an expression for  that is accurate to approximately  digits. Although Viète himself used his formula to calculate  only with nine-digit accuracy, an accelerated version of his formula has been used to calculate  to hundreds of thousands of digits.

Related formulas
Viète's formula may be obtained as a special case of a formula for the sinc function that has often been attributed to Leonhard Euler, more than a century later: 

Substituting  in this formula yields:

Then, expressing each term of the product on the right as a function of earlier terms using the half-angle formula:

gives Viète's formula.

It is also possible to derive from Viète's formula a related formula for  that still involves nested square roots of two, but uses only one multiplication:

which can be rewritten compactly as

Derivation

The first term in the product, is the ratio of areas of a square and an octagon, the second term is the ratio of areas of an octagon and a hexadecagon, etc. Thus, the product telescopes to give the ratio of areas of a square (the initial polygon in the sequence) to a circle (the limiting case of a -gon). Alternatively, the terms in the product may be instead interpreted as ratios of perimeters of the same sequence of polygons, starting with the ratio of perimeters of a digon (the diameter of the circle, counted twice) and a square, the ratio of perimeters of a square and an octagon, etc.

Another derivation is possible based on trigonometric identities and Euler's formula.
Repeatedly applying the double-angle formula

leads to a proof by mathematical induction that, for all positive integers ,

Viète's formula may be obtained from this formula by the substitution .

References

External links
 Viète's Variorum de rebus mathematicis responsorum, liber VIII (1593) on Google Books. The formula is on the second half of p. 30.

Articles containing proofs
Infinite products
Pi algorithms